Las Cruces Public Schools (LCPS) is a school district headquartered in Las Cruces, New Mexico. The school district covers the city of Las Cruces as well as White Sands Missile Range, the settlement of Doña Ana, and the town of Mesilla. The system has 24 elementary schools, eight middle schools, and seven high schools. Of the high schools, St. Mary's Catholic high school, Alma D'Arte, Las Montañas, and Arrowhead Park Early College High School are alternative high schools, and there are nearly 25,000 students and 3,600 employees.  LCPS is the second-largest school district in New Mexico.

History
In 1918, Las Cruces Union High School (now just Las Cruces High School) opened in the area. Segregation came to Las Cruces in the 1910s and was made an option for districts codified by state law in 1924. In Las Cruces, Lincoln High School opened in a church after African Americans were removed from integrated schools and in the 1930s Booker T. Washington School opened  at 755 East Chestnut, serving African Americans of all grades Clara Belle Williams, who was the first African American to graduate from the predecessor of New Mexico State University was Lincoln's first teacher and taught at the schools for more than 20 years.

Service area
Areas in the district include: Las Cruces, Butterfield Park, Doña Ana, Fairacres, Mesilla, Organ, Picacho Hills, Radium Springs, San Pablo, San Ysidro, Tortugas, University Park, and White Sands. White Sands Missile Range is in the district.

Schools

High schools

 Arrowhead Park Early College High School and Medical Academy
 Centennial High School
 Las Cruces High School
 Mayfield High School
 Organ Mountain High School
 Rio Grande Preparatory Institute

K-8 schools
 White Sands School - White Sands Missile Range

Middle schools
 Camino Real Middle
 Lynn Middle School
 Mesa Middle School
 Mesilla Valley Leadership Academy
 Picacho Middle School
 Sierra Middle School
 Vista Middle School
 Zia Middle School

Elementary schools
 Alameda Elementary School
 Booker T. Washington Elementary School
 Central Elementary School
 Cesar Chavez Elementary School
 Columbia Elementary School (closed due to everlasting mold issue)
 Conlee Elementary School
 Desert Hills Elementary School
 Doña Ana Elementary School
 East Picacho Elementary School
 Fairacres Elementary School
 Hermosa Heights Elementary School
 Highland Elementary School
 Hillrise Elementary School
 Jornada Elementary School
 Loma Heights Elementary School
 MacArthur Elementary School
 Mesilla Elementary School
 Mesilla Park Elementary School
 Monte Vista Elementary School
 Sonoma Elementary School
 Sunrise Elementary School
 Tombaugh Elementary School
 University Hills Elementary School
 Valley View Elementary School

References

External links

 Las Cruces Public Schools
 
Education in Doña Ana County, New Mexico
Las Cruces, New Mexico
School districts in New Mexico